The 2015 European Tour is the seventh edition of the Race to Dubai and the 44th season of golf tournaments since the European Tour officially began in 1972.

Northern Ireland's Rory McIlroy defended the Race to Dubai, winning the title for the third time. He was also named Golfer of the Year. South Korea's An Byeong-hun was the Sir Henry Cotton Rookie of the Year.

Changes for 2015
There were many changes from the previous season. There were six additions to the schedule, made up of four new tournaments: the True Thailand Classic, the Shenzhen International, the Saltire Energy Paul Lawrie Match Play, and the AfrAsia Bank Mauritius Open; the Hero Indian Open, which was co-sanctioned by the European Tour for the first time; and the return of the European Open, which was last played in 2009.

Seven events were lost from the schedule: the Volvo World Match Play Championship and Volvo Golf Champions, as a result of Volvo reducing their sponsorship commitments; the Nelson Mandela Championship; the NH Collection Open; The Championship at Laguna National; the Wales Open, as a 15-year deal with Celtic Manor Resort came to an end; and the Perth International, which wasn't played in 2015 due to rescheduling from October to February.

In March, the tour confirmed that the British Masters, last held in 2008, was also being revived and added to the schedule. Later in the month, the Madeira Islands Open was cancelled due to persistent heavy rain; it was later rescheduled to the end of July, opposite the Paul Lawrie Matchplay.

Schedule
The following table lists official events during the 2015 season.

Location of tournaments

Race to Dubai
Since 2009, the European Tour's money list has been known as the "Race to Dubai", and is based on money earned during the season. In a change for the 2015 season, the system was slightly modified to a full points system, with one euro equal to one point for all events leading up to the Final Series, where additional points were awarded (previously earnings were converted into points at the start of the Final Series); earnings from tournaments that award prize money in other currencies were converted at the exchange rate available the week of the event.

Final standings
Final top 15 players in the Race to Dubai:

• Did not play

Awards

Golfer of the Month

See also
2014 in golf
2015 in golf
2015 Challenge Tour
2015 European Senior Tour
2015 PGA Tour

Notes

References

External links
2015 season results on the PGA European Tour website

European Tour seasons
European Tour